The Minkowski sausage or Minkowski curve is a fractal first proposed by and named for Hermann Minkowski as well as its casual resemblance to a sausage or sausage links. The initiator is a line segment and the generator is a broken line of eight parts one fourth the length.

It is therefore often chosen when studying the physical properties of non-integer fractal objects. It is strictly self-similar. It never intersects itself. It is continuous everywhere, but differentiable nowhere. It is not rectifiable. It has a Lebesgue measure of 0. The type 1 curve has a dimension of  ≈ 1.46.

Multiple Minkowski Sausages may be arranged in a four sided polygon or square to create a quadratic Koch island or Minkowski island/[snow]flake:

See also
Self-avoiding walk
Vicsek fractal

Notes

References

External links

De Rham curves
L-systems
Hermann Minkowski